Hilscheid is an Ortsgemeinde – a municipality belonging to a Verbandsgemeinde, a kind of collective municipality – in the Bernkastel-Wittlich district in Rhineland-Palatinate, Germany.

Geography 

The municipality lies in the Hunsrück and within its municipal area is the Erbeskopf. Of the municipal area's 1 807 ha, 1 434 ha is wooded. Hilscheid belongs to the Verbandsgemeinde of Thalfang am Erbeskopf, whose seat is in the municipality of Thalfang.

History 
Beginning in the 12th century, Hilscheid was part of the Mark Thalfang, a territory roughly corresponding to today's Verbandsgemeinde. As a result of the turmoil of the French Revolution, Hilscheid lay under French rule beginning about 1800. In 1814 it was assigned to the Kingdom of Prussia at the Congress of Vienna. Since 1947, it has been part of the then newly founded state of Rhineland-Palatinate.

Politics

Municipal council 
The council is made up of 6 council members, who were elected by majority vote at the municipal election held on 7 June 2009, and the honorary mayor as chairman.

Coat of arms 
The German blazon reads: Schild von eingebogener grüner Spitze, darin eine silberne Schmelzpfanne über silbernen Flammen, gespalten; vorn in silbern eine schwarze Lyra, hinten in Gold ein blaubewehrter roter Löwe.

The municipality's arms might in English heraldic language be described thus: Tierced in mantle, dexter argent a lyre sable, sinister Or a lion rampant gules armed azure, and in base vert a melting pan over fire of the first.

The lyre is meant to express the municipality's connection with music. The red lion is a charge formerly borne by the Waldgraves and Rhinegraves. The charges in base, the fire and melting pan, stand for the former Röderbach Iron Foundry, which stood within Hilscheid's limits.

The arms have been borne since 23 January 1986.

Economy and infrastructure 
Hilscheid is a rural residential community with several agricultural businesses.

References

External links 

Bernkastel-Wittlich